Trabzon İdmanocağı is the women's football side of Trabzon İdmanocağı Spor Kulübü based at Trabzon in Turkey. The team play in the Turkish Women's First Football League. They finished the 2011–12, 2014–15 and 2015–16 seasons at third place.

History
The women's team of Trabzon İdmanocağı was established in the 2007–08 season, and played in the Women's Second League. At the end of the 2009–10 season, the team were promoted to the Women's First League. The team finished the 2011–12 season at third place.

In November 2017, the women's football section of Trabzon İdmanocağı club was transferred to the municipality of Maçka district in Trabzon Province for a period of three years. The team played the 2017-18 First League matches under their original name Trabzon İdmanocağı although officially they were named Maçka Belediyesi İdmanocağı. The team did not show up in any match of the 2018-19 First League season, officially finished the league at last position, and was so relegated.

Colors and badge
The club colors are red and yellow. Club's badge features a football in the middle flanked by the club initials "T.I.O." and the foundation year "1921" on red-yellow diagonal colors.

People from Trabzon living outside of the city demanded that the women's team wear kits with the colors claret and blue, which are in fact the colors of the rival club in the city, the successful club Trabzonspor. The board of directors of the club chaired by Mehmet Öz concluded in the beginning of the 2014–15 league season to use the colors claret and blue in respect of the people originating from Trabzon and living in the major cities, where the women's team play away matches. Team manager Gürkan Çavdar notes from experience that this implementation fulfills the fans' longing.

The team finished the 2015–16 season at third rank again.

Stadium
Trabzon İdmanocağı women's team play their home matches at Yavuz Selim Stadium in Trabzon. The venue has a seating capacity of 1,820 spectators. The ground is artificial turf.

Statistics
.

1): Three penalty points had been deducted in the beginning of the season for not showing up imposed by the Turkish Football Federation.
2): Season discontinued due to COVID-19 pandemic in Turkey

Current squad 

Head coach: Ayhan Özdemir

Former managers
 Abdülkadir Çelik
 Gürkan Çavdar
 Mustafa Keleş

Honours
 Turkish Women's First Football League
 Third places (2): 2011–12, 2014–15, 2015–16

Kit history

References

External links
 

Football
Defunct football clubs in Turkey